is a railway station in Haenosaki-cho, Sasebo, Nagasaki Prefecture, Japan. It is operated by JR Kyushu and is on the Ōmura Line.

Lines
Besides the local services on the line, some trains of the Rapid Seaside Liner also stop at the station.

Station layout 
The station consists of two side platforms serving two tracks with a siding branching off track 1. The station building, a steel frame structure of modern design, is unstaffed and the waiting room is closed. Access to the opposite side platform is by means of a level crossing with steps at both ends.

Adjacent stations

History
By 1897, the track had reached . In the next phase of expansion, the track was extended towards  which opened as the new terminus on 20 January 1898. Haenosaki was opened on the same day as an intermediate station between Haiki and Ōmura. When the Kyushu Railway was nationalized on 1 July 1907, Japanese Government Railways (JGR) took over control of the station. On 12 October 1909, track from Tosu through Haiki to Nagasaki was designated the Nagasaki Main Line. With the privatization of Japanese National Railways (JNR), the successor of JGR, on 1 April 1987, control of the station passed to JR Kyushu.

At the end of the Second World War, Japanese soldiers and civilians repatriated from overseas were housed in nearby Hario Island. After a period of quarantine, they were then transported home in special trains from Haenosaki Station. This part of the station history is written about on a sign board at the station.

Passenger statistics
In fiscal 2014, there were a total of 6,423 boarding passengers, giving a daily average of 18 passengers.

Environs
Haenosaki Post Office
Sasebo City Office Miya Branch

See also
 List of railway stations in Japan

References

External links
Haenosaki Station (JR Kyushu)

Railway stations in Nagasaki Prefecture
Railway stations in Japan opened in 1898
Sasebo